The 2003 EA Sports 500 was a NASCAR Winston Cup Series race that took place on September 28, 2003, at Talladega Superspeedway in Talladega, Alabama. It was the 29th race of the 2003 NASCAR Winston Cup Series.

Race report 
For this race only, Jasper Motorsports switched from Ford to Dodge, taking advantage of their engine building partnership with Team Penske (who switched from Ford to Dodge that season). As a result, Ford terminated their factory support agreement with the team following the race.

One of the most notable moments of the race is when on lap 182, Elliott Sadler would come down and hit Kurt Busch's right side of Busch's car. Elliott's car would spin and fly into the air, doing a full flip before landing on its roof. The car would slide down the backstretch grass into Turn 3, then proceeded to flip onto the Turn 3 surface 4 and a half times, before finally landing on the wheels of the car. Sadler was unhurt.

Results

References

EA Sports 500
EA Sports 500
NASCAR races at Talladega Superspeedway
September 2003 sports events in the United States